In 1911, 57 merit badges were issued by the Boy Scouts of America.  Many of them exist to this day and are listed below in green.
  Many of the others have been discontinued or reintroduced with different names.  Of the discontinued original merit badges, four were offered in 2010 as part of the Boy Scouts of America centennial.  These merit badges are listed in beige.

Soon after the introduction of merit badges, the ranks of Life, Star, and Eagle were created to recognize the earning of merit badges; Star was moved before Life in 1924.

Original merit badges

References

See also
Merit badge (Boy Scouts of America)
History of merit badges (Boy Scouts of America)
Discontinued merit badges (Boy Scouts of America)

Advancement and recognition in the Boy Scouts of America
Scouting-related lists